Lindsay Michelle Burdge (born July 27, 1984) is an American actress and producer known for her roles in independent films such as A Teacher (2013), Wild Canaries (2014), The Midnight Swim (2014), The Invitation (2015), and 6 Years (2015).

Life and career
Burdge was born in Pasadena, California. She attended New York University. In 2013, she had her breakthrough role as Diana Watts in Hannah Fidell's drama film A Teacher, which follows an affair had between a teacher (Burdge) and her student. The film premiered at the Sundance Film Festival on January 20, 2013, and was given a limited release in the United States on September 6, 2013. She has since co-starred in a number of films, including Wild Canaries (2014), The Midnight Swim (2014), The Invitation (2015), 6 Years (2015), and Thirst Street (2017).

Filmography

Television

References

External links
 

Living people
21st-century American actresses
American film actresses
Film producers from California
Actresses from Pasadena, California
1984 births
American women film producers